Kintore railway station is in Kintore, Scotland on the Aberdeen–Inverness line. Originally opened in 1854, it closed in 1964 but was reopened on a different site in 2020.

History

Original station

The station became a junction in 1859 with the opening of a branch to Alford. This branch closed to passengers in 1949. Kintore railway station itself was closed in 1964 as part of the Beeching cuts.

Modern station
Nestrans initially raised the possibility of reopening a Kintore station in 2009 as part of its 2010-2021 Rail Action Plan and it was first discussed in the Scottish Parliament in October that year. Plans to reopen the station were announced in December 2012.

Reopening Kintore was made possible by the completion of phase one of the Aberdeen-Inverness Improvement Project, which redoubled the track between Aberdeen and Inverurie, increasing capacity for new passenger and freight services on the route. The station cost £15 million, funded by Transport Scotland, Aberdeenshire Council and Nestrans. The main contractor was BAM Nuttall. Construction started in 2019 with opening planned for May 2020, but work was halted between March and July 2020 due to the coronavirus pandemic, which caused the opening date to be pushed back to 15 October.

Facilities

Facilities include a new footbridge and lifts for step-free access, bike storage facilities and a 168-space car park including disabled parking and 24 charging spaces for electric vehicles. Signs and benches from the original station were refurbished and installed at the new station. The station is accessible generally including ticket machines; there is a waiting room but no ticket office.

Passenger volume 

The statistics cover twelve month periods that start in April.

Services
The new station is served by hourly trains between Inverurie and Montrose, and other services between Aberdeen and Inverurie/Inverness. Services to Aberdeen run half hourly at peak times Monday to Saturday, with an hourly service on Sundays.

References

Bibliography

External links 

 Video footage of the station on YouTube

Disused railway stations in Aberdeenshire
Former Great North of Scotland Railway stations
Railway stations in Great Britain opened in 1854
Railway stations in Great Britain closed in 1964
Beeching closures in Scotland
1854 establishments in Scotland
1964 disestablishments in Scotland
Railway stations in Aberdeenshire
Railway stations opened by Network Rail
Railway stations in Great Britain opened in 2020
Railway stations served by ScotRail
Kintore, Aberdeenshire
2020 establishments in Scotland